The 2000 U.S. House of Representatives election for the state of North Dakota's at-large congressional district was held November 7, 2000. The incumbent, Democratic-NPL Congressman Earl Pomeroy was re-elected to his fifth term, defeating Republican candidate John Dorso.

Only Pomeroy filed as a Dem-NPLer, and the endorsed Republican candidate was John Dorso, who was serving as the North Dakota House Majority Leader. Pomeroy and Dorso won the primary elections for their respective parties.

While the election was the closest for Pomeroy since 1994, Dorso was unable to defeat the four-term congressman. Dorso's father, Carmen Dorso, died during the campaign from leukemia.

Two independent candidates, Jan Shelver and Kenneth R. Loughead, also sought the seat, but had little impact on the result. Loughead had previously sought the seat in 1998 and 1996.

Election results

References

External links
2000 North Dakota U.S. House of Representatives Election results

North Dakota
2000
2000 North Dakota elections